Draževac may refer to:
 Draževac (Aleksinac), a village in Aleksinac, Serbia
 Draževac (Obrenovac), a village in Obrenovac, Serbia